Driverless may refer to:
A computer able to configure itself, without explicit driver software, see Plug-'n'-Play.
A train without a human driver, see Automatic train operation.
A vehicle which navigates without human input, see Autonomous car.
Driverless tractor
Driverless (film), a 2010 Chinese film directed by Zhang Yang.